Tinner may refer to:
 Friedrich Tinner, a Swiss engineer
 A person involved in tin mining who came under the jurisdiction of the former Stannary Courts and Parliaments
 Another name for a tinsmith
 A person who applies a coating of tin to iron, copper, or brass.

See also
 The Tinners, a regiment formed by Nicholas Slanning during the English Civil War
 Tinners rabbits, another name for the three hares motif, and a dance by the same name
 Tinner's fluid, a common name for zinc chloride when used as a flux